Ali Bitchin (c.1560-1645) was a "renegade" (Christian converted to Islam) who made his fortune in Algiers through privateering. Bitchin (or Bitchnin) was believed to be born with the family name of Piccini or Puccini or Piccinino in Venice. He was a Grand Admiral of Algiers and is known for a mosque he built in the district of Zoudj-Aïoun in the old city (Casbah), which still bears his name today.

Bitchin became particularly well known through the captivity narratives published by Emanuel D'Aranda, his slave for about a year from 1640 to 1641. Dispute lingers about whether Bitchin should be regarded as having held the post of Governor of Algiers because of his very brief (and possibly apocryphal) seizure of power in 1645.

Biography 

Bitchin was part of a group of people captured in 1578, by Hassan Veneziano the King of Algiers at the time, while aboard a Venetian ship. Bitchin, only a ten-year-old boy at the time, was bought from the Babel Boustan slaves market (current fishery) for 60 golden dinars, by the Raïs Fettah-Allah Ben-Khodja, from whom he learned privateering.

With the exception of Rais Hamidou who lived in the late eighteenth century, no pirate was as much liked as Ali Bitchin. Under his command, the Algerian Navy assured her supremacy over the Mediterranean, blithely crossing the Straits of Gibraltar and pushing all the way to the Arctic Circle. Bitchin's privateers entered the Atlantic Ocean and ascended to Ireland. They managed to attack Madeira. Always fearless, they often attacked heavier vessels from their light boats regardless of the number of enemies. They resisted the most violent storms, appeared unexpectedly, and taunted their enemy with their wild audacity.

Bitchin became the foster father of Algiers by the countless riches confiscated and imported on his ships to the city. He thus contributed to the apparent opulence of the Algerian capital.

Bitchin has left a trace of himself in the Regency of Algiers between 1620 and 1645, the date of his death. In 1622, he had built the Ali Bitchin Mosque. Between 1621 and 1645, he was the supreme head of the Taifa (corporation of the Rais), and took on the title Grand Admiral of Algiers. His wealth became huge. He owned a palace in the city, a home in the countryside, several galleys and thousands of slaves. His large slave holdings did not prevent him from feeding them a simple piece of bread or biscuit, yet not every day.

The mosque 

Tradition says that when Ali Bitchin saw Princess Lalla Lallahoum, the daughter of Ben Ali, Sultan of the Kabyle people of Algiers, for the first time, he could not resist the desire to love her; she was considered the most beautiful woman of all. All his senses were troubled, and his days restless. Accompanied by Lalla N'fiça, widow of his mentor, Raïs Fethullah Ben-Khodja, Bitchin went to Ben Ali seeking the hand of his daughter.

Bitchin placed at the foot of the beautiful princess carpets of Persia, silks and brocades of the Levant, diamonds from India, Peru's gold and much more. Lalla Lallahoum regarded with indifference these riches: "No, she said, I have nothing to do of all this, I demand that my suitor build a mosque to prove his faith". Ali Bitchin Mosque was built that same year, in 1622.

Death and legacy 

Towards 1639, the Algerian navy, under the command of Ali Bitchin, suffered extensive damage alongside the Ottoman fleet against the Venetians in Aulona (modern-day Vlorë, Albania) on the Adriatic Sea. The Turkish Sultan accordingly promised compensations to the King of Algiers, but never sent the promised subsidies for the reconstruction of the Algerian fleet.

Raising the legitimate anger of the Raïs, Bitchin made the decision not to aid the Turkish Navy in the future. During 1645, Sultan Ibrahim summoned all the Algerian warships to fight the Knights of Malta and the Venetians. Of course Bitchin and his pirates refused to attend. This "disobedience" was interpreted by the Sultan as an act of high treason. The Sultan secretly gave orders to his minions to poison Bitchin. According to public opinion, it was his servant, paid with gold, who plotted and carried out the assassination of Bitchin, by poisoning his coffee.

Bitchin was buried in Djebanet El Bashawet (cemetery of the Pashas) in the Bab El Oued neighborhood, and was unearthed with many others in 1831. In fact the French invaders later in 1832 transformed his Mosque into a Roman Catholic church calling it Notre Dame des Victoires, as they did the Ketchaoua Mosque of the lesser Casbah. In doing this, they profaned the Djebanet El Bashawet. New buildings were built upon the graves.

Anne Jean Marie René Savary donated the cemetery lands to several officers who divided them into parcels. Without qualms, they unearthed the bones that were shipped to Marseilles. As evidenced by the letter Ibrahim Pasha wrote to the King of France on 2 February 1831: "The greatest pain that was made to our hearts is to destroy our cemeteries and to expose the desecrated remains of our ancestors.... Such injustice is painful to bear. This is contrary to all religions.... "

Dr. Segaud wrote in an article published in the Semaphore of Marseilles, bearing date of 2 March 1832: "I saw The Josephine ship that arrived in Algiers loaded with bones, and human skulls, and of corpses recently unearthed. "

References 
 
 
 
 

Algerian people of Italian descent
1560 births
1645 deaths
Barbary pirates
Burials in Algeria
Converts to Sunni Islam from Catholicism
17th-century Algerian people
Ottoman slave owners
Ottoman slave traders